Juan is a given name, the Spanish and Manx versions of John. The name is of Hebrew origin and has the meaning "Gift from God". It is very common in Spain and in other Spanish-speaking communities around the world and in the Philippines, and also (pronounced differently) in the Isle of Man. The name is becoming popular around the world and can be pronounced differently according that region.

Chinese terms 
  ( or  娟, 隽) 'beautiful, graceful' is a common given name for Chinese women.
  The Chinese character 卷, which in Mandarin is almost homophonic with the characters for the female name, is a division of a traditional Chinese manuscript or book and can be translated as 'fascicle', 'scroll', 'chapter', or 'volume'.

Notable people 
 Juan (footballer, born 1979), Brazilian footballer
 Juan (footballer, born 1982), Brazilian footballer
 Juan (footballer, born March 2002), Brazilian footballer
 Juan (footballer, born April 2002), Brazilian footballer
 Juan Acevedo, Mexican baseball pitcher
 Juan Alberto Belloch, Spanish politician and mayor of Zaragoza
 Juan Almeida Bosque, Cuban politician and one of the original commanders of the Cuban Revolution
 Juan Andrés y Morell, Spanish writer and historian
 Juan de Arraçola, colonial governor of Spanish Florida 1612–1613
 Juan Nekai Babauta, former governor of the Northern Mariana Islands
 Juan Bosch, first 'cleanly' elected president of Dominican Republic
 Juan Carlos I of Spain, King of Spain 1975–2014
 Juan Carlos Onetti, Uruguayan author
 Juan Castro, Mexican baseball infielder
 Juan Chioran, Argentine-Canadian actor
 Juan Corona (1934–2019), Mexican serial killer
 Juan Cruz (born 1978), Dominican baseball pitcher
 Juan Cruz (born 1966), Spanish screenwriter and film director
 Juan Aubín Cruz Manzano (born 1948), Puerto Rican politician and mayor of Manatí since 1977
 Juan R. Cruz (born 1946), Puerto Rican aerospace engineer at NASA
 Juan Lazo Cruz (born 1977), Salvadoran football midfielder
 Juan de la Cierva, Spanish civil engineer and pilot, inventor of the autogyro
 Juan Debiedma, American computer game player
 Juan Diego (name), Multiple people
 Juan Domínguez, Colombian footballer
 Juan Domínguez, Dominican baseball player
 Juan Domínguez Lamas, Spanish footballer
 Juan Domínguez Otaegui, Spanish footballer
 Juan Catalino Domínguez (1910–1948), Argentine serial killer
 Juan Domínguez, Spanish road racing cyclist
 Juan Domingo Perón, Argentine general and politician
 Juan Encarnación, Dominican baseball player
 Juan Manuel Eguiagaray, Spanish politician and academic
 Juan Ponce Enrile, President of the Philippine Senate 2008–2013
 Juan Fontena, Chilean basketball player
 Juan Gabriel, Mexican singer and songwriter
 Juan González, Puerto Rican baseball player
 Juan Gris, Spanish painter
 Juan Fernando Hermosa (1976–1996), Ecuadorian teenage serial killer
 Juan Ignacio Cirac Sasturain, Spanish physicist
 Juan Karlos Labajo, Filipino singer-songwriter
 Juan Jesus, Brazilian footballer
 Juan Joya Borja, Spanish Comedian and Internet meme
 Juan Leal, First Mayor of San Antonio, Texas
 Juan Antonio Llorente, 18th-century historian
 Juan Luis Vives, Spanish scholar and humanist
 Juan Luis Arsuaga, Spanish paleontologist
 Juan Ramón Jiménez, Spanish poet who received the Nobel Prize in Literature in 1956
 Juan Manuel, Prince of Villena, Spanish medieval writer
 Juan Manuel Blanes, Uruguayan painter
 Juan Manuel Fangio, Argentine racing driver
 Juan Manuel Santos, Colombian President
 Juan Marichal, Dominican baseball player
 Juan Martín del Potro, Argentine tennis player
 Juan Mata, Spanish footballer who plays for English club Manchester United
 Juan Mateo, Dominican baseball player
 Juan López Mella (1965–1995), Spanish motorcycle racer
 Juan Miro, Catalan painter
 Juan Morillo (born 1972), Venezuelan sprinter
 Juan Morillo (born 1983), Dominican baseball pitcher
 Juan Pablo Montoya Roldán, Colombian racing driver
 Juan Nicasio, Dominican baseball player
 Juan Padilla, Puerto Rican baseball pitcher
 Juan Padilla, Cuban baseball second baseman
 Juan Pérez (born 1978), Dominican baseball pitcher
 Juan Pérez (born 1986), Dominican baseball outfielder
 Juan Pérez (died before 1513), Spanish Franciscan and companion of Christopher Columbus
 Juan Pérez (born 1956), American municipal politician and lawyer
 Juan Pérez (born 1985), Mexican football player
 Juan Pérez (born 1974), Spanish Olympic handball player
 Juan Pérez Alsina, Argentine politician
 Juan Pérez de Gijón (fl. 1460–1500), Spanish composer of the Renaissance
 Juan Pérez de Montalbán (1602–1638), Spanish dramatist, poet and novelist
 Juan Pérez de la Serna (1573–1631), seventh Archbishop of Mexico
 Juan Pérez de Zurita (1516–c. 1595), Spanish conquistador
 Juan José Pérez Hernández (c. 1725–1775), Spanish explorer
 Juan Pérez (1932–?), Chilean Olympic cyclist
 Juan Carlos Pérez (born 1981), Bolivian trap shooter
 Juan de Dios Pérez (born 1980), Panamanian footballer
 Juan Manuel Pérez (born 1993), Argentine footballer
 Juan David Pérez (born 1991), Colombian footballer
 Juan Pérez Medina (born 1960), Mexican politician and educator
 Juan Perón, President of Argentina
 Juan Pierre, American baseball player
 Juan Pizarro Navarrete, Spanish physician and politician
 Juan Ponce de León, Spanish explorer
 Juan Rincón, Venezuelan baseball pitcher
 Juan Rivera (fl. 1765), Spanish explorer of North America
 Juan Rivera (born 1978), Venezuelan baseball outfielder
 Juan Rivera (born 1972), American wrongfully convicted three times of a rape and murder
 Juan Rivera, American singer and actor
 Juan Rojas (died 1578), Catholic prelate
 Juan Roman Riquelme, Argentine footballer
 Juan Rosai (1940–2020), Italian-American pathologist
 Juan Rulfo (1917–1986), Mexican author
 Juan Sebastián Elcano, Spanish explorer
 Juan Sebastián Verón, Argentine footballer
 Juan Pablo Sorín (born 1976), Argentinian footballer
 Juan Thornhill (born 1996), American football player
 Juan Toscano, Mexican basketball player
 Juan Trippe, founder of Pan American World Airways
 Juan Uder (1927–2020), Argentine basketball player
 Juan Uribe, Dominican baseball infielder
 Juan Valdez, colonial governor of Texas
 Juan Vasquez (disambiguation), several people
 Juan de Yepes Álvarez, Spanish poet and Catholic Saint (Saint John of the Cross)

Manx people with the name 
 Juan Noa, poet
 Juan Turner, politician, businessman, and media personality
 Juan Watterson, politician

Fictional characters 
 Don Juan, the main character of the Philippine story Ibong Adarna
 Juan, a character in the Pokémon universe
 Juan Cabrillo, the main character of the book series Oregon Files
 Juan Carlos "Juice" Ortiz, a character of the Sons of Anarchy television series
 Juan Crisóstomo Ibarra, the main character of Jose Rizal's Noli Me Tángere
 Juan Rico, a Filipino character from the novel Starship Troopers
 Juan Sánchez Villa-Lobos Ramírez, a character from the Highlander film series
 Juan Tamad, a character in Philippine folklore
 Juan Valdez a coffee branding character
 Juan, a character in Barney & Friends
 Juan, a character in The ABCs of Death
 Juan Cortez, a character in Far Cry 6
 Juan Cortez, a character in Grand Theft Auto: Vice City

See also 
 Alternate forms for the name John
 Don Juan (disambiguation)
 João, the corresponding Portuguese name
 Joan (first name), the corresponding Catalan name
 Jean (male given name), the corresponding French name
 John (given name), the corresponding English name
 San Juan (disambiguation)
 Tropical Storm Juan (disambiguation), a list of hurricanes, typhoons and storms named Juan
 Juan Station, and Juan-dong, in Nam-gu, Incheon, South Korea
 Jwan (disambiguation)
 Juwan (disambiguation)

References 

Spanish masculine given names
Manx given names